Time Out for Love is a 1961 French film directed by Jean Valère starring Jean Seberg.

It was also known as Les grandes personnes.

Cast 
Jean Seberg as Ann
Maurice Ronet as Philippe
Micheline Presle as Michele
Annibale Ninchi as Dr. Severin
Françoise Prévost as Gladys

References

External links

1961 films
French drama films
1960s French-language films
Films directed by Jean Valère
1960s French films